West Badin Historic District is a national historic district located at Badin, Stanly County, North Carolina. The district encompasses 153 contributing buildings and 4 contributing sites in the company town of Badin.  They were built starting about 1912 and include residential, institutional, and commercial structures in Gothic Revival and Bungalow / American Craftsman style architecture. The community was developed by the Southern Aluminum Company of America, later Alcoa, with West Badin developed for African-American residents. Notable buildings include the houses at 704 Roosevelt Street and 417 Jackson Street, 228-226 Lincoln Avenue duplex, Baptist Church, McDonald's Chapel AME Zion Church, and Badin Colored School.

It was added to the National Register of Historic Places in 1983.

References

African-American history of North Carolina
Historic districts on the National Register of Historic Places in North Carolina
Gothic Revival architecture in North Carolina
Buildings and structures in Stanly County, North Carolina
National Register of Historic Places in Stanly County, North Carolina